Soni Setiawan (born 10 April 1993) is an Indonesian professional footballer who plays as a full-back for Liga 2 club Persekat Tegal.

Club career

Persekabpur Purworejo 
When he was 18 years old, Setiawan played for the club Persekabpur Purworejo in the Indonesian League Second Division Level. Soni succeeded in escorting Persekabpur Purworejo to the Round of 8 of National Division II in 2012, so that in the following season Persekabpur Purworejo appeared in Division I.

PPSM Sakti Magelang 
Setiawan played for PPSM Sakti Magelang in the 2012/2013 for the 2013 Liga Indonesia Premier Division (LI). With PPSM Sakti Magelang he has performed 10 matches.

Persijap Jepara 
After defending PPSM Sakti Magelang], Setiawan moved to Persijap Jepara in the 2015 season after previously focusing on participating in the Pre PON Central Java throughout 2014. Unfortunately in 2015, the competition stopped, but Soni still defended Persijap Jepara at the Polda Jateng Cup event but failed to bring Persijap Jepara through the group stage.

PSIS Semarang
He was signed for PSIS Semarang to play in Liga 1 in the 2019 season. Soni made his debut on 26 May 2019 in a match against Persija Jakarta at the Moch. Soebroto Stadium, Magelang.

Persekat Tegal
In 2021, Soni signed a contract with Indonesian Liga 2 club Persekat Tegal. He made his league debut on 27 September in a 3–1 win against Badak Lampung, and he also scored his first goal for Persekat in the 88rd minute at the Gelora Bung Karno Madya Stadium, Jakarta.

References

External links
 Soni Setiawan at Soccerway
 Soni Setiawan at Liga Indonesia

1993 births
Living people
Indonesian Muslims
Indonesian footballers
Association football defenders
Indonesian Premier Division players
Liga 1 (Indonesia) players
Liga 2 (Indonesia) players
PPSM Magelang players
Persijap Jepara players
Perseden Denpasar players
Persis Solo players
PSIS Semarang players
People from Magelang
Sportspeople from Central Java